Demonte Tyrone Harper (born June 21, 1989) is an American professional basketball player for Derthona Basket of the Italian LBA. He played college basketball at Morehead State University.

High school career
Harper attended Whites Creek High School in Whites Creek, Tennessee. Harper went to the AAA State Final Four both his junior and senior year.  After his senior year season in 2007, Harper was awarded All-District First Team and All-Region First Team.

College career
Harper played his college basketball career at Morehead State University. He was awarded OVC All-Tournament Team in 2009.  In 2011, he was awarded All-OVC First Team, OVC Tournament MVP and OVC All-Tournament Team after making a three-point shot with 4.2 seconds left for a 62–61 victory over No. 4 Louisville, which was the first big upset of the 2011 NCAA Tournament. In 2011, Harper was invited to play in the NCAA Portsmouth Invitational Tournament.

Harper finished his MSU career in 2010–11 by being named to the Lou Henson All-America Team and the National Association of Basketball Coaches All-District 19 Team. He concluded his collegiate career with 1,436 points, placing him 13th all-time at Morehead State University.

College statistics

NCAA Special Events statistics

Professional career
Demonte Harper went undrafted in the 2011 NBA draft, making him an unrestricted free agent.

In July 2012, Harper landed a spot on the Denver Nuggets NBA Summer League team in Las Vegas, Nevada. Harper averaged 5 points per game.  His highest scoring game was 17 points against the Portland Trail Blazers along with 5 assists and 5 defensive rebounds.

In September 2012, Harper signed a contract with the Portland Trail Blazers which was put on waivers in October 2012.

The Reno Bighorns selected Demonte Harper in Round 2 with Pick 5 in the 2012 Annual NBA Development League Draft. On November 5, 2012, Harper was acquired from Reno in a trade by the Erie BayHawks.

In September 2013, Harper signed with BC Tsmoki-Minsk of Belarus. In preseason action for Tsmoki-Minsk, Harper scored 17 points in a 94–88 win over Budivelnyk.

In July 2014, Harper was added to the Denver Nuggets NBA Summer League team's roster. Harper scored 7 points in less than 7 minutes against the NBA D-League Select team. Against the Los Angeles Lakers, Harper's defense was irreplaceable as he played over 28 minutes, scoring 8 points, 4 rebounds, 1 assist, 1 steal, and 1 blocked shot.

In August 2014, Harper signed with Enel Brindisi, also known as New Basket Brindisi, in Brindisi, Italy.

On July 27, 2015, Harper signed with Czarni Słupsk of the Polish Basketball league.

On September 2, 2016, Harper signed with Estonian club Kalev/Cramo of the 2016–17 season.

On March 14, 2017, it was announced that Harper moved to B.C. Zenit Saint Petersburg. He averaged 10.6 points per game. On July 7, 2018, Harper signed with the Turkish team Tofaş.

On January 25, 2019, he has signed with Sidigas Avellino of the Italian Lega Basket Serie A (LBA).  On July 26, 2019, Harper signed a one-year deal with Spanish club Herbalife Gran Canaria. He re-signed the following season and averaged 12.9 points per game. On July 29, 2021, Harper signed with Limoges CSP of the LNB Pro A.

On July 3, 2022, he has signed with Derthona Basket of the Italian LBA.

NBA D-League statistics

Belarusian Premier League statistics

Eurochallenge statistics

VTB United League statistics

References

External links
FIBA.com Profile
Profile at Eurobasket.com
RealGM.com Profile
Demonte Harper Erie Bayhawks 2012–2013 Highlights
Demonte Harper Tsmoki-Minsk 2013–2014 Highlights

1989 births
Living people
American expatriate basketball people in Belarus
American expatriate basketball people in Croatia
American expatriate basketball people in Estonia
American expatriate basketball people in Italy
American expatriate basketball people in Poland
American expatriate basketball people in Russia
American expatriate basketball people in Spain
American expatriate basketball people in Turkey
American men's basketball players
Basketball players from Nashville, Tennessee
BC Kalev/Cramo players
BC Tsmoki-Minsk players
BC Zenit Saint Petersburg players
CB Gran Canaria players
Czarni Słupsk players
Erie BayHawks (2008–2017) players
KK Cibona players
Liga ACB players
Limoges CSP players
Morehead State Eagles men's basketball players
New Basket Brindisi players
Point guards
Shooting guards
S.S. Felice Scandone players
Tofaş S.K. players